Pendleton High School may refer to:

Pendleton High School (Indiana), Pendleton, Indiana
Pendleton High School (Falmouth, Kentucky), Falmouth, Kentucky
Pendleton High School (Oregon), Pendleton, Oregon
Pendleton High School (South Carolina), Pendleton, South Carolina
Pendleton School, Bradenton, Florida